Richard Ivy Feacher (born February 11, 1954) is a former  professional American football wide receiver. Feacher played in nine National Football League seasons from 1976–1984, primarily for the Cleveland Browns. Holds the record for the fastest 100 yard dash 9.6, and was a star football player for the Hernando High School Leopards, located in Brooksville, Florida. In 2011, Feacher was inducted into the Hernando High School Hall of Fame.

References

External links

1954 births
Living people
People from Crystal River, Florida
American football wide receivers
Mississippi Valley State Delta Devils football players
New England Patriots players
Cleveland Browns players
Players of American football from Florida